The following is a timeline of military preparations and engagements during the Suez Crisis.

Preparations

British planning 
In July 1956, Anthony Eden ordered his Chief of the Imperial General Staff, Field Marshal Gerald Templer, to begin planning for an invasion of Egypt. Eden's plan called for the Cyprus-based 16th Independent Parachute Brigade Group to seize the canal zone. The Prime Minister's plan was rejected by Templer and the other service chiefs, who argued that the neglect of parachute training in the 16th Independent Parachute Brigade rendered his plan for an airborne assault unsuitable. Instead, they suggested the sea-power based Contingency Plan, which called for the Royal Marines to take Port Said, which would then be used as a base for three British divisions to overrun the canal zone.

In early August, the Contingency Plan was modified by including a strategic bombing campaign that was intended to destroy Egypt's economy, and thereby hopefully bring about Nasser's overthrow. In addition, a role was allocated to the 16th Independent Parachute Brigade, which would lead the assault on Port Said in conjunction with the Royal Marine landing. The commanders of the Allied Task Force led by General Stockwell rejected the Contingency Plan, which Stockwell argued failed to destroy the Egyptian Armed Forces.

Franco-Israeli planning 
In July 1956, IDF chief of staff General Moshe Dayan advised Prime Minister David Ben-Gurion that Israel should attack Egypt at the first chance, but Ben-Gurion stated he preferred to attack Egypt with the aid of France. On 7 August 1956 the French Defense Minister Maurice Bourgès-Maunoury asked Ben Gurion if Israel would attack Egypt together with France, to which he received a positive reply. On 1 September 1956 the French government formally asked that France and Israel begin joint planning for a war against Egypt. By 6 September 1956, Dayan's chief of operations General Meir Amit, was meeting with Admiral Pierre Barjot to discuss joint Franco-Israeli operations. On 25 September 1956 Peres reported to Ben-Gurion that France wanted Israel as an ally against Egypt, and that the only problem was Britain, which was opposed to Israel taking action against Nasser.

In late September 1956, the French Premier Guy Mollet had embarked upon a dual policy of attacking Egypt with Britain, and if the British backed out (as Mollet believed that they might), with Israel. On 30 September 1956 secret Franco-Israeli talks on planning a war started in Paris, which were based on the assumption that Britain would not be involved. The French very much wanted to use airfields in Cyprus to bomb Egypt, but being not certain about Britain's attitude, wanted to use Israeli airfields if the ones in Cyprus were not free. Only on 5 October 1956 during a visit by General Maurice Challe to Britain where he met with Eden, were the British informed of the secret Franco-Israeli alliance.

On 22 October 1956, during negotiations leading to the Protocol of Sèvres, Ben-Gurion gave an explanation to foreign dignitaries of Israel's overall strategy for the Middle East. His main objection to the "English plan" was that Israel would be branded as the aggressor while Britain and France would pose as peace-makers.Instead he presented a comprehensive plan, which he himself called "fantastic", for the reorganization of the Middle East. Jordan, he observed, was not viable as an independent state and should therefore be divided. Iraq would get the East Bank in return for a promise to settle the Palestinian refugees there and to make peace with Israel while the West Bank would be attached to Israel as a semi-autonomous region. Lebanon suffered from having a large Muslim population which was concentrated in the south. The problem could be solved by Israel's expansion up to the Litani River, thereby helping to turn Lebanon into a more compact Christian state. ... Israel declares its intention to keep her forces for the purpose of permanent annexation of the entire area east of the El Arish-Abu Ageila, Nakhl-Sharm el-Sheikh, in order to maintain for the long term the freedom of navigation in the Straits of Eilat and in order to free herself from the scourge of the infiltrators and from the danger posed by the Egyptian army bases in Sinai. ... "I told him about the discovery of oil in southern and western Sinai, and that it would be good to tear this peninsula from Egypt because it did not belong to her, rather it was the English who stole it from the Turks when they believed that Egypt was in their pocket. I suggested laying down a pipeline from Sinai to Haifa to refine the oil."

Protocol of Sèvres 

In October 1956, Eden, after two months of pressure, finally and reluctantly agreed to French requests to include Israel in Operation Revise. The British alliances with the Hashemite kingdoms of Jordan and Iraq had made the British very reluctant to fight alongside Israel, lest the ensuing backlash in the Arab world threaten London's friends in Baghdad and Amman. The coming of winter weather in November meant that Eden needed a pretext to begin Revise as soon as possible, which meant that Israel had to be included. This was especially the case as many Conservative backbenchers had expected Eden to launch operations against Egypt in the summer, and were disappointed when Eden had instead chosen talks. By the fall of 1956, many Tory backbenchers were starting to grow restive about the government's seeming inability to start military action, and if Eden had continued to put off military action for the winter of 1956–57, it is possible that his government might not have survived.

Three months after Egypt's nationalisation of the Suez Canal company, a secret meeting took place at Sèvres, outside Paris. Britain and France enlisted Israeli support for an alliance against Egypt. The parties agreed that Israel would invade the Sinai. Britain and France would then intervene, purportedly to separate the warring Israeli and Egyptian forces, instructing both to withdraw to a distance of 16 kilometres from either side of the canal.

The British and French would then argue that Egypt's control of such an important route was too tenuous, and that it needed to be placed under Anglo-French management. David Ben-Gurion did not trust the British in view of their treaty with Jordan and he was not initially in favour of the plan, since it would make Israel alone look like the aggressor; however he soon agreed to it since such a good opportunity to strike back at Egypt might never again present itself.

Under the Protocol of Sèvres, the following was agreed to:

 29 October: Israel to invade the Sinai.
 30 October: Anglo-French ultimatum to demand both sides withdraw from the canal zone.
 31 October: Britain and France begin Revise.

Anglo-French Operation Musketeer 

Stockwell offered up Operation Musketeer, which was to begin with a two-day air campaign that would see the British gain air superiority. In place of Port Said, Musketeer called for the capture of Alexandria. Once that city had been taken in assault from the sea, British armoured divisions would engage in a decisive battle of annihilation somewhere south of Alexandria and north of Cairo.

Musketeer would require thousands of troops, leading the British to seek out France as an ally. To destroy the 300,000-strong Egyptian Army in his planned battle of annihilation, Stockwell estimated that he needed 80,000 troops, while at most the British Army could spare was 50,000 troops; the French could supply the necessary 30,000 troops to make up the shortfall.

On 11 August 1956, General Charles Keightley was appointed commander of Musketeer with the French Admiral Barjot as his deputy commander. The appointment of Stockwell as the Allied Task Force commander charged with leading the assault on Egypt caused considerable disappointment with the other officers of the Task Force. One French officer recalled that Stockwell was

By contrast, the majority of the officers of the Task Force, both French and British, admired André Beaufre as an elegant yet tough general with a sharp analytical mind who always kept his cool. Most of the officers of the Anglo-French Task Force expressed regret that it was Beaufre who was Stockwell's deputy rather the other way around. A major problem both politically and militarily with the planning for Musketeer was the one-week interval between sending troops to the eastern Mediterranean and the beginning of the invasion. Additionally, the coming of winter weather to the Mediterranean in late November would render the invasion impossible, which thus meant the invasion had to begin before then. An additional problem was Eden, who constantly interfered with the planning and was so obsessed with secrecy that he refused to tell Keightley what his political objectives were in attacking Egypt: namely, whether he wanted to retake the Suez Canal or topple Nasser, or both. Eden's refusal to explain to Keightley just what exactly he was hoping to accomplish by attacking Egypt exasperated Keightley to no end, and greatly complicated the planning process.

In late August 1956, the French Admiral Pierre Barjot suggested that Port Said once again be made the main target, which lessened the number of troops needed and thus reduced the interval between sending forces to the eastern Mediterranean and the invasion. Beaufre was strongly opposed to the change, warning that Barjot's modification of merely capturing the canal zone made for an ambiguous goal, and that the lack of a clear goal was dangerous. In early September, Keightley embraced Barjot's idea of seizing Port Said, and presented Revise.

Britain's First Sea Lord, Admiral Louis Mountbatten strongly advised his old friend Prime Minister Anthony Eden against the Conservative plans to seize the Suez canal. He argued that such a move would destabilize the Middle East, undermine the authority of the United Nations, divide the Commonwealth and diminish Britain's global standing. His advice was not taken; he tried to resign but the political leadership of the Royal Navy would not let him. Instead he worked hard to prepare the Royal Navy for war with characteristic professionalism and thoroughness.

Anglo-French Operation Revise 
Operation Revise called for the following:

 Phase I: Anglo-French air forces to gain air supremacy over Egypt's skies.
 Phase II: Anglo-French air forces were to launch a 10-day "aero-psychological" campaign that would destroy the Egyptian economy.
 Phase III: Air- and sea-borne landings to capture the canal zone.

On 8 September 1956 Revise was approved by the British and French cabinets.

Both Stockwell and Beaufre were opposed to Revise as an open-ended plan with no clear goal beyond seizing the canal zone, but was embraced by Eden and Mollet as offering greater political flexibility and the prospect of lesser Egyptian civilian casualties.

Israeli preparations 
At the same time, Israel had been working on Operation Kadesh for the invasion of the Sinai. Dayan's plan put an emphasis on air power combined with mobile battles of encirclement. Kadesh called for the Israeli Air Force to win air superiority, which was to be followed up with "one continuous battle" in the Sinai. Israeli forces would in a series of swift operations encircle and then take the main Egyptian strong points in the Sinai.

Israeli military planning for the operation hinged on four main military objectives: Sharm el-Sheikh, Arish, Abu Uwayulah (Abu Ageila), and the Gaza Strip. Egyptian forces blockaded the Tiran Straits (based at Sharm el-Sheikh) since 1953, and by capturing the town, Israel would regain access to the Red Sea and trade benefits of secure passage to the Indian Ocean. The Gaza Strip was chosen as another military objective because Israel wished to remove the training grounds for Fedayeen groups, and because Israel recognised that Egypt could use the territory as a staging ground for attacks against the advancing Israeli troops. Israel advocated rapid advances, for which a potential Egyptian flanking attack would present even more of a risk. Arish and Abu Uwayulah were important hubs for soldiers, equipment, and centres of command and control of the Egyptian Army in the Sinai. Capturing them would deal a deathblow to the Egyptian's strategic operation in the entire Peninsula. The capture of these four objectives were hoped to be the means by which the entire Egyptian Army would rout and fall back into Egypt proper, which British and French forces would then be able to push up against an Israeli advance, and crush in a decisive encounter.

Reflecting this emphasis on encirclement was the "outside-in" approach of Kadesh, which called for Israeli paratroopers to seize distant points first, with those closer to Israel to be seized later. Thus, the 202nd Paratroop Brigade commanded by Colonel Ariel Sharon was to land in the far-western part of the Sinai to take the Mitla Pass, and thereby cut off the Egyptian forces in the eastern Sinai from their supply lines.

American intelligence 
The American Central Intelligence Agency (CIA) was taking high-altitude photos of the allied activities, and more details came from human sources in London, Paris, and Tel Aviv. CIA chief Allen Dulles said that "intelligence was well alerted as to what Israel and then Britain and France were likely to do ... In fact, United States intelligence had kept the government informed".

Operation Kadesh

Beginning 

The conflict began on 29 October 1956. At about 3:00 pm, Israeli Air Force Mustangs launched a series of attacks on Egyptian positions all over the Sinai. Because Israeli intelligence expected Jordan to enter the war on Egypt's side, Israeli soldiers were stationed along the Israeli-Jordanian frontier. The Israel Border Police militarised the Israel-Jordan border, including the Green Line with the West Bank, during the first few hours of the war. Israeli-Arab villages along the Jordanian border were placed under curfew. This resulted in the killings of 48 civilians in the Arab village of Kafr Qasim in an event known as the Kafr Qasim massacre. The border policemen involved in the killings were later tried and imprisoned, with an Israeli court finding that the order to shoot civilians was "blatantly illegal". This event had major effects on Israeli law relating to the ethics in war and more subtle effects on the legal status of Arab citizens of Israel, who at the time were regarded as a fifth column.

Early actions in Southern Sinai 

The IDF chief of staff, General Moshe Dayan, first planned to block the vital Mitla Pass. Dayan planned for the Battalion 890 of the Paratroop Brigade, under the command of Lieutenant Colonel Rafael Eitan, a veteran of the 1948 Arab–Israeli War and future head of the IDF, to drop at Parker's Memorial, near one of the defiles of the pass, Jebel Heitan. The rest of the brigade, under the command of Colonel Ariel Sharon would then advance to meet with the battalion, and consolidate their holdings.

On 29 October, Operation Kadesh – the invasion of the Sinai, began when an Israeli paratrooper battalion was air-dropped into the Sinai Peninsula, east of the Suez Canal near the Mitla Pass. In conjunction with the para drop, four Israeli P-51 Mustangs using their wings and propellers, cut all overhead telephone lines in the Sinai, severely disrupting Egyptian command and control. Due to a navigation error, the Israeli DC-3 transports landed Eitan's 400 paratroopers three miles away from Parker's Memorial, their intended target. Eitan marched his men towards Jebel Heitan, where they dug in while receiving supplies of weapons dropped by French aircraft.

At the same time, Colonel Sharon's 202nd Paratroop Brigade raced out towards the Mitla Pass. A major problem for Sharon was vehicle break-down. Dayan's efforts to maintain strategic surprise bore fruit when the Egyptian commander Field Marshal Abdel Hakim Amer at first treated the reports of an Israeli incursion into the Sinai as a large raid instead of an invasion, and as such Amer did not order a general alert. By the time that Amer realised his mistake, the Israelis had made significant advances into the Sinai.

Early actions along the Gulf of Aqaba, and the central front 
As the paratroopers were being dropped into the Sinai, the Israeli 9th Infantry Brigade captured Ras al-Naqb, an important staging ground for that brigade's later attack against Sharm el-Sheikh. Instead of attacking the town by a frontal attack, they enveloped the town in a night attack, and negotiated their way through some of the natural chokepoints into the rear of the town, surprising the Egyptians before they could ready themselves to defend. The Egyptians surrendered, with no Israeli casualties sustained.

The 4th Infantry Brigade, under the command of Colonel Josef Harpaz, captured al-Qusaymah, which would be used as a jumping off point for the assault against Abu Uwayulah. Colonel Harpaz out-flanked al-Qusaymah with two pincers from the south-east and north-east in a night attack. In a short battle lasting from 3:00 am to sunrise, the IDF stormed al-Qusaymah.

Battle of Jebel Heitan, paratroop brigade under attack 

The portion of the paratroopers under Sharon's command continued to advance to meet with the 1st Brigade. En route, Sharon assaulted Themed in a dawn attack, and was able to storm the town with his armour through the Themed Gap. Sharon routed the Sudanese police company, and captured the settlement. On his way to the Nakla, Sharon's men came under attack from Egyptian MIG-15s. On the 30th, Sharon linked up with Eytan near Nakla.

Dayan had no more plans for further advances beyond the passes, but Sharon decided to attack the Egyptian positions at Jebel Heitan. Sharon sent his lightly armed paratroopers against dug-in Egyptians supported by aircraft, tanks and heavy artillery. Sharon's actions were in response to reports of the arrival of the 1st and 2nd Brigades of the 4th Egyptian Armored Division in the area, which Sharon believed would annihilate his forces if he did not seize the high ground. Sharon sent two infantry companies, a mortar battery and some AMX-13 tanks under the command of Mordechai Gur into the Heitan Defile on the afternoon of 31 October 1956.

The Egyptian forces occupied strong defensive positions and brought down heavy anti-tank, mortar and machine gun fire on the IDF force. Gur's men were forced to retreat into the "Saucer", where they were surrounded and came under heavy fire. Hearing of this, Sharon sent in another task force while Gur's men used the cover of night to scale the walls of the Heitan Defile. During the ensuing action, the Egyptians were defeated and forced to retreat. A total of 260 Egyptian and 38 Israeli soldiers were killed in the battle.

Although the battle was an Israeli victory, the casualties sustained would surround Sharon with controversy. In particular, Sharon was criticised for ordering the attack on Jebel Heitan without authorisation, and not realising that with the Israeli Air Force controlling the skies, his men were in no such danger from the Egyptian tanks as he believed. Dayan himself maintained that Sharon was correct to order the attack without orders, and that under the circumstances, Sharon made the right decision; instead he criticised Sharon for his tactics of attacking the Egyptians head-on, which Dayan claimed led to unnecessary casualties.

Air operations, first phase 

From the outset, the Israeli Air Force flew paratroop drops, supply flights and medevac sorties. Israel's new French-made Dassault Mystere IV jet fighters provided air cover for the transport aircraft. In the initial phase of the conflict, the Egyptian Air Force flew attack missions against advancing Israeli ground forces. The Egyptian tactic was to use their new Soviet-made MiG-15 jets as fighter escorts, while their older British-made De Havilland Vampire and Gloster Meteor jets conducted strikes against Israeli troops and vehicles.

In air combat, Israeli aircraft shot down between seven and nine Egyptian jets with the loss of one plane, but Egyptian strikes against the ground forces continued through to 1 November. In a major action on 31 October, waves of Israeli planes attacked the Egyptian 1st Armored Brigade as it moved toward Abu-Ageila, devastating it. According to an Israeli pilot who participated in the attack "Car after car and tank after tank caught fire... At first it looked like a peacetime firing range." Eight Egyptian MiG-15s attacked the Israeli aircraft, damaging two, while Egyptian anti-aircraft fire hit five more Israeli aircraft and killed two pilots. On the following day, with the Anglo-French entry into the war, a combined force of Israeli and French aircraft again attacked the Egyptian 1st Armored Brigade. With the attack by the British and French air forces and navies, President Nasser ordered his pilots to disengage and fly their planes to bases in southern Egypt. The Israeli Air Force was then free to strike Egyptian ground forces at will, as Israeli forces advanced into the western Sinai.

On 3 November, Israeli Dassault Mystère fighter jets attacked a British warship, the Black Swan class sloop HMS Crane as it was patrolling the approaches to the Gulf of Aqaba after it had been mistaken for an Egyptian Navy warship. The ship was attacked with rockets, cannon fire, and napalm bombs. The attack inflicted widespread damage on the hull, damaging two antiaircraft guns, destroying a depth charge thrower, and cutting various electrical circuits and water mains, but the ship's fighting efficiency was only slightly impaired. Three crewmen were wounded in the attack. The ship put up heavy anti-aircraft fire, and there are conflicting accounts as to whether or not it shot down one of the attacking jets.

Naval operations 

On 30 October, the Egyptian Navy dispatched Ibrahim el Awal, an ex-British , to Haifa with the aim of shelling that city's coastal oil installations. On 31 October Ibrahim el Awal reached Haifa and began bombarding the city with its four  guns. The French destroyer Kersaint, which was guarding Haifa port as part of Operation Musketeer, returned fire but failed to score any hits. Ibrahim el Awal disengaged and turned northwest. Left without power and unable to steer, Ibrahim el Awal surrendered to the Israeli destroyers. During the engagement, the Ibrahim el Awal's crew lost two killed and eight wounded. The Egyptian destroyer was subsequently incorporated into the Israeli Navy and renamed INS Haifa.

On the night of 31 October in the northern Red Sea, the British light cruiser  challenged and engaged the Egyptian frigate Domiat, reducing it to a burning hulk in a brief battle, sustaining only light damage in return. The Egyptian warship was then sunk by escorting destroyer . Of the Domiat's crew, 38 were killed and 69 survived and were rescued. British losses in the engagement were one killed and five wounded. On 4 November, a squadron of Egyptian motor torpedo boats attacked a British destroyer off the northeast coast of the Nile Delta. The attack was repelled, with three torpedo boats sunk and the rest retreating.

Hedgehog–Abu Uwayulah operations 
The village of Abu Uwayulah,  inside Egyptian territory, served as the road centre for the entire Sinai, and thus was a key Israeli target. To the east of Abu Uwayulah were several ridges that formed a natural defensive zone known to the Israelis as the "Hedgehog". Holding the "Hedgehog" were 3,000 Egyptians of the 17th and 18th battalions of the 3rd Infantry Division commanded by Colonel Sami Yassa. Yassa's men held a series of well-fortified trenches. The "Hedgehog" could only be assaulted from the east flank of Umm Qataf ridge and the west flank of Ruafa ridge.

On 30 October, a probing attack by Israeli armour under Major Izhak Ben-Ari turned into an assault on the Umm Qataf ridge that ended in failure. During the fighting at Umm Qataf, Colonel Yassa was badly wounded and replaced by Colonel Saadedden Mutawally. To the south, another unit of the Israeli 7th Armored Brigade discovered the al-Dayyiqa gap in the Jebel Halal ridge of the "Hedgehog". The Israeli forces stormed and took the al-Dayyiqa gap. Colonel Mutawally failed to appreciate the extent of the danger to his forces posed by the IDF breakthrough at al-Dayyiqa.

Led by Colonel Avraham Adan, an IDF force entered the al-Dayyiqa and at dawn on 31 October attacked Abu Uwayulah. After an hour's fighting, Abu Uwayulah fell to the IDF. At the same time, another IDF battalion attacked the Ruafa ridge.

Concurrently, another attack was launched on the eastern edge of the "Hedgehog" by the IDF 10th Infantry Brigade (composed mostly of reservists) that ended in failure. By noon, the Israeli Air Force had carried out a series of punishing airstrikes on the Egyptian positions, sometimes accidentally hitting IDF ground forces. Such was the tendency of the IAF to stage "friendly fire" incidents the IAF was arguably as much a danger to the Israeli troops as to the enemy.

After taking Abu Uwayulah, Adan committed all of his forces against the Ruafa ridge of the "Hedgehog". Adan began a three-pronged attack with one armoured force striking northeastern edge of Ruafa, a mixed infantry/armored force attacking the north edge and a feint attack from a neighbouring knoll. During the evening attack on 31 October, a chaotic battle raged on Ruafa ridge with much hand-to-hand fighting. Though every IDF tank involved was destroyed, after a night's fighting, Ruafa had fallen to the IDF. Another IDF assault that night, this time by the 10th Infantry Brigade on Umm Qataf was less successful with much of the attacking force getting lost in the darkness, resulting in a series of confused attacks that ended in failure. Dayan, who had grown impatient with the failure to storm the "Hedgehog", sacked the 10th Brigade's commander Colonel Shmuel Golinda and replaced him with Colonel Israel Tal.

On the morning of 1 November, Israeli and French aircraft launched frequent napalm attacks on the Egyptian troops at Umm Qataf. Joined by the 37th Armored Brigade, the 10th Brigade again assaulted Umm Qataf, and was again defeated. However, the ferocity of the IDF assault combined with rapidly dwindling stocks of water and ammunition caused Colonel Mutawally to order a general retreat from the "Hedgehog" on the evening of 1 November.

Gaza Strip operations 

The city of Rafah was strategically important to Israel because control of that city would sever the Gaza Strip from the Sinai and provide a way to the main centres of the northern Sinai, al-Arish and al-Qantarah. Holding the forts outside of Rafah were a mixture of Egyptian and Palestinian forces in the 5th Infantry Brigade commanded by Brigadier General Jaafar al-Abd. In Rafah itself the 87th Palestinian Infantry Brigade was stationed. Assigned to capture Rafah were 1st Infantry Brigade led by Colonel Benjamin Givli and 27th Armored Brigade commanded by Colonel Haim Bar-Lev of the IDF. To the south of Rafah were a series of mine-filled sand dunes and to the north were a series of fortified hills.

Dayan ordered the IDF forces to seize Crossroads 12 in the central Rafah area, and to focus on breaking through rather than reducing every Egyptian strongpoint. The IDF assault began with Israeli sappers and engineers clearing a path at night through the minefields that surrounded Rafah. French warships led by the cruiser Georges Leygues provided fire support, through Dayan had a low opinion of the French gunnery, complaining that the French only struck the Egyptian reserves.

Using the two paths cleared through the southern minefields, IDF tanks entered the Rafah salient. Under Egyptian artillery fire, the IDF force raced ahead and took Crossroads 12 with the loss of 2 killed and 22 wounded. In the north, the Israeli troops fought a confused series of night actions, but were successful in storming Hills 25, 25A, 27 and 29 with the loss of six killed. In the morning of 1 November, Israeli AMX-13s encircled and took Hills 34 and 36. At that point, General al-Abd ordered his forces to abandon their posts outside of Rafah and retreat into the city.

With Rafah more or less cut off and Israeli forces controlling the northern and eastern roads leading into the city, Dayan ordered the AMX-13s of the 27th Armored Brigade to strike west and take al-Arish. By this point, Nasser had ordered his forces to fall back towards the Suez Canal, so at first Bar-Lev and his men met little resistance as they advanced across the northern Sinai. Hearing of the order to withdraw, General al-Abd and his men left Rafah on the morning of 1 November through a gap in the Israeli lines, and headed back towards the canal zone. Three hours later, the Israelis took Rafah. It was reported that after taking Rafah, Israeli troops killed 111 people, including 103 refugees, in Rafah's Palestinian refugee camp. The circumstances of the killings are disputed. Not until the Jeradi Pass in the northern Sinai did the IDF run into serious opposition. A series of hooking attacks that out-flanked the Egyptian positions combined with airstrikes led to an Egyptian defeat at the Jeradi Pass. On 2 November, Bar-Lev's forces took al-Arish. Although the city itself fell without a fight after its defenders retreated, Bar-Lev's troops did occasionally come under fire from Egyptian stragglers as they crossed into the Sinai, and Moshe Dayan's radio operator was killed in one such incident.

Meanwhile, the IDF attacked the Egyptian defences outside of Gaza City late on 1 November. After breaking through the Egyptian lines, the Israeli tanks headed into Gaza City. Joined by infantry, the armour attacked the al-Muntar fortress outside of Gaza City, killing or capturing 3,500 Egyptian National Guard troops. By noon of 2 November, there was no more Egyptian opposition in the Gaza City area. On 3 November, the IDF attacked Egyptian and Palestinian forces at Khan Yunis. After a fierce battle, the Israeli 37th Armored Brigade's Sherman tanks broke through the heavily fortified lines outside of Khan Yunis held by the 86th Palestinian Brigade.

After some street-fighting with Egyptian soldiers and Palestinian fedayeen, Khan Yunis fell to the Israelis. There are claims that after taking Khan Yunis, the IDF committed a massacre, known as the Khan Yunis killings. Israel maintained that the Palestinians were killed in street-fighting, while the Palestinians claimed that Israeli troops started executing unarmed Palestinians after the fall of Khan Yunis. The claims of a massacre were reported to the United Nations General Assembly on 15 December 1956 by the Director of the United Nations Relief and Works Agency, Henry Labouisse, who reported from "trustworthy sources" that 275 people were killed in the massacre of which 140 were refugees and 135 local residents.

In both Gaza City and Khan Yunis, street-fighting led to the deaths of "dozens, perhaps hundreds, of non-combatants". Food and medicine distribution for refugees in need of assistance was complicated when some Palestinians ransacked the warehouses belonging to the United Nations Relief and Works Agency. This was compounded by a widespread view in Israel that the responsibility for the care of the Palestinian refugees rested with the UNRWA, not Israel, which led the Israelis to be slow with providing aid. By noon of 3 November, the Israelis had control of almost the entire Gaza Strip save for a few isolated strong points, which were soon attacked and taken. The UN estimated that in total 447 to 550 Palestinian civilians were killed by Israeli troops during the first weeks of Israeli occupation of the strip. The manner in which these people were killed is disputed.

Sharm el-Sheikh operations 
By 3 November, with the IDF having successfully taken the Gaza Strip, Arish, the Hedgehog, and Mitla Pass, Sharm el-Sheikh was the last Israeli objective. The main difficulty faced by Colonel Abraham Yoffe's 9th Infantry Brigade was logistical. There were no good roads linking Ras an-Naqb to Sharm el-Sheikh. After taking the border town of Ras an-Naqb on 30 October, Dayan ordered Yoffe to wait until air superiority was ensured.

To outflank Sharm el-Sheikh, Dayan ordered paratroopers to take the town of Tor in the western Sinai. The Egyptian forces at Sharm el-Sheikh had the advantage of holding one of the most strongly fortified positions in the entire Sinai, but had been subjected to heavy Israeli air attacks from the beginning of the war. Yoffe set out for Sharm el-Sheikh on 2 November, and his major obstacles were the terrain and vehicle break-down. Israeli Navy ships provided support to the 9th Division during its advance.

After numerous skirmishes on the outskirts of Sharm el-Sheikh, Yoffe ordered an attack on the port around midnight on 4 November. After four hours of heavy fighting, Yoffe ordered his men to retreat. On the morning of 5 November, Israeli forces launched a massive artillery barrage and napalm strikes against Egyptian forces defending Sharm el-Sheikh. At 9:30 am on 5 November, the Egyptian commander, Colonel Raouf Mahfouz Zaki, surrendered Sharm el-Sheikh. The Israelis had lost 10 killed and 32 wounded, while the Egyptians had lost about 100 killed and 31 wounded. Another 864 Egyptian soldiers were taken prisoner.

Anglo-French Canal invasion 

To support the invasion, large air forces had been deployed to Cyprus and Malta by Britain and France and many aircraft carriers were deployed. The two airbases on Cyprus were so congested that a third field which was in dubious condition had to be brought into use for French aircraft. Even RAF Luqa on Malta was extremely crowded with RAF Bomber Command aircraft.

In addition,  and  acted as jumping-off points for Britain's helicopter-borne assault (the world's first).

The combined fleet was shadowed and even harassed by the United States Sixth Fleet, commanded by Vice Admiral Charles R. Brown.

Revise: Phases I and II 
In the morning of 30 October Britain and France sent ultimatums to Egypt and Israel. They initiated Operation Musketeer on 31 October, with a bombing campaign. Nasser responded by sinking all 40 ships present in the canal closing it to all shipping—shipping would not move again until early 1957. Despite the risk of an invasion in the canal zone, Field Marshal Abdel Hakim Amer ordered Egyptian troops in the Sinai to stay put, as Amer confidently assured Nasser that the Egyptians could defeat the Israelis in the Sinai and then defeat the Anglo-French forces once they came ashore in the canal zone.

Amer also advised Nasser to send more troops into the Sinai to inflict his promised defeat on Israel, even though the risk of their being cut off if the canal zone were seized by Anglo-French forces was enormous. Not until late on 31 October did Nasser disregard Amer's rosy assessment and ordered his forces to disengage in the Sinai and to retreat back to the canal zone to face the expected Anglo-French invasion. Eden and Mollet ordered Phase I of Operation Revise to begin 13 hours after the Anglo-French ultimatum.

British bombers based in Cyprus and Malta took off to Cairo with the aim of destroying Cairo airport, only to be personally ordered back by Eden when he learned that American civilians were being evacuated at Cairo airport. Fearful of the backlash that might result if American civilians were killed in a British bombing attack, Eden sent the Valiant bombers back to Malta while the Canberra's were ordered to hit Almaza airbase outside of Cairo. British night bombing proved ineffective.

Starting on the morning of 1 November, carrier-based de Havilland Sea Venoms, Chance-Vought Corsairs and Hawker Sea Hawks began a series of daytime strikes on Egypt. By the night of 1 November the Egyptian Air Force had lost 200 planes. With the destruction of Egypt's air force, Keightley ordered the beginning of Revise Phase II. As part of Revise Phase II, a wide-ranging interdiction campaign began. On 3 November F4U-7 Corsairs from the 14.F and 15.F Aéronavale taking off from the French carriers Arromanches and La Fayette, attacked the aerodrome at Cairo. One French Corsair was shot down by Egyptian anti-aircraft fire. Its pilot survived and was subsequently captured and executed by the Egyptians, reportedly by stoning.

The very aggressive French General Beaufre suggested at once that Anglo-French forces seize the canal zone with airborne landings instead of waiting the planned ten days for Revise II to be worked through, and that the risk of sending in paratroopers without the prospect of sea-borne landings for several days be taken. By 3 November, Beaufre finally convinced Keightley and Stockwell of the merits of his approach, and gained the approval for Operation Telescope as Beaufre had code-named the airborne assault on the canal zone.

On 2 November 1956 the First Sea Lord Admiral Mountbatten sent a letter to Eden telling him to stop the invasion before troops landed in the canal zone as the operation had already proved to be too costly politically. The next day, Mountbatten made a desperate phone call to Eden asking for permission to stop the invasion before it began, only to be refused. Mountbatten's views led to clash of personalities with the Chief of the Imperial General Staff, General Gerald Templer who supported the invasion. In response to Mountbatten's call to cancel the invasion, Templer penned a memo, which read:Some people in England today say that what we're done in the Middle East will have terrible effects in the future. ... The reality is that we have checked a drift. With a bit of luck we're not only stopped a big war in the Middle East, but we're halted the march of Russia through the Middle East and on to the African continent.

Telescope modified: the paratroops land 

In the early morning of 5 November, an advance element of the 3rd Battalion of the British Parachute Regiment dropped on El Gamil Airfield, a narrow strip of land, led by Brigadier M.A.H. Butler. The "Red Devils" could not return Egyptian fire while landing, but once the paratroopers landed, they used their Sten guns, three-inch mortars and anti-tank weapons with great effect. Having taken the airfield with a dozen casualties, the remainder of the battalion flew in by helicopter. The Battalion then secured the area around the airfield.

During the ensuing street fighting, the Egyptian forces engaged in methodical tactics, fighting on the defence while inflicting maximum casualties and retreating only when overwhelming force was brought to bear. In particular, the SU-100 tank destroyers proved to be a formidable weapon in urban combat. The British forces moved up towards Port Said with air support before digging in at 13:00 to hold until the beach assault. With close support from carrier-based Hawker Sea Hawks and Westland Wyverns, the British paratroopers took Port Said's sewage works, after which they captured the cemetery in a battle during which they killed about 30 Egyptians without losing a man in return, and became engaged in a pitched battle for the Coast Guard barracks, during which withering fire from the defenders stalled the advance. An attack by supporting Wyverns inflicted heavy casualties on the defenders, although the lead aircraft was shot down during the attack. Overall, the British paratroopers had managed to inflict a decisive defeat on the Egyptians for the loss of 4 dead and 32 wounded.

At the same time, Lieutenant Colonel Pierre Chateau-Jobert landed with a force of the 2nd RPC at Raswa. Raswa imposed the problem of a small drop zone surrounded by water, but General Jacques Massu of the 10th Parachute Division assured Beaufre that this was not an insolvable problem for his men. 500 heavily armed paratroopers of the French 2nd Colonial Parachute Regiment (2ème RPC), hastily redeployed from combat in Algeria, jumped over the al-Raswa bridges from Nord Noratlas 2501 transports of the Escadrille de Transport (ET) 1/61 and ET 3/61, together with some combat engineers of the Guards Independent Parachute Company.

The paratroopers swiftly secured the western bridge at the cost of two soldiers, putting Egyptian positions out of action with bazookas and mortars, and F4U Corsairs of the Aéronavale 14.F and 15.F flew a series of close-air-support missions, destroying several SU-100s. F-84Fs also hit two large oil storage tanks in Port Said, which went up in flames and covered most of the city in a thick cloud of smoke for the next several days. Egyptian resistance varied, with some positions fighting back until destroyed, while others were abandoned with little resistance. The French paratroopers stormed and took Port Said's waterworks that morning, an important objective to control in a city in the desert. Chateau-Jobert followed up this success by beginning an attack on Port Fuad. Derek Varble, the American military historian, later wrote "Air support and fierce French assaults transformed the fighting at Port Fuad into a rout". During the fighting in the canal zone, the French paratroopers often practised their "no-prisoners'" code and executed Egyptian POWs.

The Egyptian commander at Port Said, General Salahedin Moguy then proposed a truce. His offer was taken up, and in the ensuring meeting with General Butler, Chateau-Jobert and General Massu, was offered the terms of surrendering the city and marching his men to the Gamil airfield to be taken off to prisoner-of-war camps in Cyprus. Moguy had no interest in surrendering and had only made the truce offer to buy time for his men to dig in; when fighting began again vans with loudspeakers travelled through the city encouraging resistance against the invaders, by announcing that London and Paris had been bombed by the Russians and that World War III had started. As the paratroopers alone were not enough, Beaufre and British Admiral Manley Laurence Power urged that the sea-borne landings be accelerated and that Allied forces land the very next day.

Stockwell and Knightley, who wished to stick with the original plan, opposed this. Stockwell was always in favour of rigidly following already agreed to plans, and was most reluctant to see any changes, whereas Beaufre was all for changing plans to match with changed circumstances. The differences between Stockwell and Beaufre were summarised by the American historian Derek Varble as: "Stockwell favored existing plans; their methodical construction and underlying staff work reduced risks. Beaufre, by contrast an opportunist, saw plans merely a means to an end, without much inherent value. For him, altered circumstances or assumptions provided adequate justification to jettison part or all of the original plan".

Royal Marines come ashore at Port Said 

At first light on 6 November, commandos of No. 42 and 40 Commando Royal Marines stormed the beaches, using landing craft of World War II vintage (Landing Craft Assault and Landing Vehicle Tracked). The battle group standing offshore opened fire, giving covering fire for the landings and causing considerable damage to the Egyptian batteries and gun emplacements. The town of Port Said sustained great damage and was seen to be alight.

The men of 42 Commando as much as possible chose to by-pass Egyptian positions and focused on trying to break through inland. The Royal Marines of 40 Commando had the advantage of being supported by Centurion tanks as they landed on Sierra Red beach. Upon entering downtown Port Said, the Marines became engaged in fierce urban combat as the Egyptians used the Casino Palace Hotel and other strongpoints as fortresses.

Nasser proclaimed the Suez War to be a "people's war". As such, Egyptian troops were ordered to don civilian clothes while guns were freely handed out to Egyptian civilians. From Nasser's point of view, a "people's war" presented the British and French with an unsolvable dilemma. If the Allies reacted aggressively to the "people's war", then that would result in the deaths of innocent civilians and thus bring world sympathy to his cause while weakening morale on the home front in Britain and France. If the Allies reacted cautiously to the "people's war", than that would result in Allied forces becoming bogged down by sniper attacks, who had the advantage of attacking "with near impunity by hiding among crowds of apparent non-combatants".

These tactics worked especially well against the British. British leaders, especially Eden and the First Sea Lord Admiral Sir Louis Mountbatten were afraid of being labelled "murderers and baby killers", and sincerely attempted to limit Egyptian civilian deaths. Eden frequently interfered with Revise Phase I and II bombing, striking off various targets that he felt were likely to cause excessive civilian deaths, and restricted the gun sizes that could be used at the Port Said landings, again to minimise civilian deaths.

The American historian Derek Varble has commented that the paradox between Eden's concern for Egyptian civilians and the object of Revise Phase II bombing, which was intended to terrorise the Egyptian people, was never resolved. Despite Eden's best efforts, British bombing still killed hundreds of Egyptian civilians during Revise II, though these deaths were due more to imprecise aiming rather than a deliberate policy of "area bombing" such as that employed against Germany in World War II. At Port Said, the heavy fighting in the streets and the resulting fires destroyed much of the city, killing many civilians.

In the afternoon, 522 additional French paratroopers of the 1er REP (Régiment Étranger Parachutiste, 1st Foreign Parachute Regiment) were dropped near Port Fuad. These were also constantly supported by the Corsairs of the French Aéronavale, which flew very intensive operations: for example, although the French carrier La Fayette developed catapult problems, no less than 40 combat sorties were completed. The French were aided by AMX-13 light tanks. While clearing Port Fuad, the 1er Regiment Etranger Parachutiste killed 100 Egyptians without losing a man in return. After securing Port Fuad, the French continued to face sporadic sniper fire and fought a pitched battle for an Egyptian police post a mile to the east of the town, losing two soldiers while killing or capturing all of its 72 defenders.

British commandos of No. 45 Commando assaulted by helicopter, meeting stiff resistance, with shore batteries striking several helicopters, while friendly fire from British carrier-borne aircraft also mistakenly hit 45 Commando and HQ. One Marine was killed and 15 wounded when a carrier-based Wyvern mistakenly fired into a concentration of Marines. The helicopter-borne assault of 45 Commando was the first time helicopters were used by UK forces to lift men directly into a combat zone. Lieutenant Colonel Norman Tailyour, who was leading 45 Commando was landed by mistake in a stadium still under Egyptian control resulting in a very hasty retreat. Street fighting and house clearing, with strong opposition from well-entrenched Egyptian sniper positions, caused further casualties. Most Egyptian soldiers now wore civilian clothing and operated in small groups, but remained organized. Civilians who took up arms as guerrillas were organized into eight groups with five additional groups joining them from outside the city. The Egyptians were gradually pushed back as the British took key objectives. In one instance, five British officers were killed or wounded by an Egyptian hidden in a wardrobe.

Especially fierce fighting took place at the Port Said's Customs House and Navy House. The Egyptians destroyed Port Said's Inner Harbour, which forced the British to improvise and use the Fishing Harbour to land their forces. The 2nd Bn of the Parachute Regiment landed by ship in the harbour. Centurion tanks of the British 6th Royal Tank Regiment were landed and by 12:00 they had reached the French paratroopers. The link-up of British and French forces occurred close to the offices of the Suez Canal Company. While the building was captured with ease, the surrounding warehouses were heavily defended and were only taken in fierce fighting during which two British soldiers were killed. The warehouses were overrun with the help of supporting fire from Centurion tanks firing at point-blank range. While the British were landing at Port Said, the men of the 2 RPC at Raswa fought off Egyptian counter-attacks featuring SU-100 self-propelled guns.

After establishing themselves in a position in downtown Port Said, 42 Commando headed down the Shari Muhammad Ali, the main north–south road to link up with the French forces at the Raswa bridge and the Inner Basin lock. While doing so, the Marines also took Port Said's gasworks. Meanwhile, 40 Commando supported by the Royal Tank Regiment remained engaged in clearing the downtown of Egyptian snipers. Colonel Tailyour arranged for more reinforcements to be brought in via helicopter.

Hearing rumours that Moguy wished to surrender, both Stockwell and Beaufre left their command ship HMS Tyne for Port Said. Upon landing, they learned the rumours were not true. Instead of returning to the Tyne, both Stockwell and Beaufre spent the day in Port Said, and were thus cut off from the news. Only late in the day did Beaufre and Stockwell learn of the acceptance of the United Nations ceasefire. Rather than focusing on breaking out to take al-Qantarah, the Royal Marines became bogged down in clearing every building in Port Said of snipers. The Centurions of the Royal Tank Regiment supported by the paratroopers of 2 RPC began a slow advance down to al-Qantarah on the night of 6 November.

Egyptian sniper attacks and the need to clear every building led the 3 Para to be slowed in their attempts to link up with the Royal Marines. When Stockwell learned of the ceasefire to come into effect in five hours' time at 9:00 pm, he ordered Colonel Gibbon and his Centurions to race down and take al-Qantarah with all speed to improve the Allied bargaining position. What followed was a confused series of melee actions down the road to al-Qantarah that ended with the British forces at al-Cap, a small village four miles north of al-Qantarah at 2:00 am, when the ceasefire came into effect. Total Royal Marine casualties in the Port Said landings were 9 killed and 60 wounded.

References

Citations

Bibliography

 
 
 
 
 
 
 

Suez Crisis
Military timelines
1956 in international relations
1956 in Egypt
Invasions of Egypt
British Empire
British military occupations
Israel–United Kingdom relations
Egypt–Israel military relations
France–United Kingdom military relations